Gargee'an, sometimes spelled as Gerga'oon (Arabic: قرقاعون), is a semiannual celebration, observed primarily in Eastern Arabia. It takes place on the 15th night of the Islamic month of Sha'ban and on the 15th night of Ramadan. It is celebrated by children dressing in traditional attire and going door-to-door to receive sweets and nuts from neighbours, as they sing traditional songs. The tradition has existed for hundreds of years, and is deeply rooted in some parts of the Gulf culture, especially in Iraq, Kuwait, Bahrain and Saudi Arabia.

Although the celebration of Gargee'an shares superficial similarities with the Western Halloween custom of trick-or-treating, Gargee'an has no connection with horror and developed independently.

Etymology and alternative names 
The exact origin of the word Qarqī'ān is unknown though several theories exist. One states that it is derived from Qarqa'ah ( “click”, “snick”), referring to the sound of iron pots carrying the sweets hitting each other while serving the sweets. Another theory says that children in Medina sang "Qarrat Al-'Ain, Qarrat Al-'Ain" (Arabic: قرة العين, literally "eye water-parsnip" or wideleaf waterparsnip, but figuratively "darling" and also a title of poet Táhirih).

The holiday is known by other names in the wider Arab world: Majeena or Garangao in Iraq, Garangao or Garangaou in Qatar, Gargaaown im Bahrain, Al-Nasifa in Qatif,  Karkee'aan or Qariqaan in Saudi Arabia, Gargee'aan or Girgian in Kuwait, Ahwaz, Garangashoch, At-Tablah or Qarnakosh in Oman, and Hag Al-Leylah in the UAE. Kurds also celebrate this holiday, and call it Barrat.

Religious significance
 
Both Gerga'oon nights are significant to Shia Muslims. Shia believe that Gerga'oon on the 15th of Sha'ban marks the birthday of Muhammad al-Mahdi, the 12th Imam. Gerga'oon on the 15th of Ramadan meanwhile coincides with the birth of Imam Hasan ibn Ali, the second Imam in Shia Islam and the fifth Rashidun caliph in Sunni Islam. As a result, the occasion is seen as a time of happiness and festivities by Shia Muslims, particularly in Bahrain. Events at night include the preaching of sermons in mosques, and carnival-like attractions in capital cities of Eastern Arabia such as Manama.

Tradition
Children gather in small choir groups in front of a home and sing. The song is intended to ask God to bless the youngest child of the family with health, and that the mother will remain happy. The more they sing, the more nuts and sweets they receive. The Qarqee'an tradition is intended to spread love, happiness and affection among adults and children.

In modern times, supermarkets, corporations, and malls compete to attract children during this time via advertisements, and by offering special promotions and arranging exclusive Qarqee'an events to market themselves.

See also
Culture of Eastern Arabia
Culture of Bahrain
Culture of Kuwait

References

External links
Kuwaiti government statement

Holiday foods
Arab culture
Ramadan
Folklore
Kuwaiti culture
Eid (Islam)
Middle Eastern cuisine